Rue Cujas is a street in the 5th arrondissement of Paris, named after the legal expert Jacques Cujas (1522-90), since it neighbours the Faculté de droit.

References

External links

Cujas